The Mundeshwari Devi Temple (also spelled Mundesvari) is a Hindu temple, located at Ramgarh Village,  on the Mundeshwari Hills of Kaimur plateau near Son River, in the Indian state of Bihar. It is an Archaeological Survey of India (ASI) protected monument since 1915. The ASI has recently dated the structure to 108 CE making it the oldest Hindu temple in the country. An information plaque at the site indicates the dating of the temple at least to 625 CE and Hindu inscriptions dated 635 CE were found in the temple. 

It is an ancient temple dedicated to the worship of the goddess Durga and is considered one of the oldest functional Hindu temples in India. The findings also established that here was a religious and educational center spread over the hillock and Mandaleshwar (Shiva) temple was the main shrine. The Mandaleshwari (Durga) was on the southern side. The temple was damaged and the idol of Mandaleshwari (degenerated Mundeshwari and later connected with the mythical demon Mund) was kept in the eastern chamber of the main temple.

History

Timelines 
  Before 100 CE - Yoganarasimha temple in Nagamangala Taluk, Karnataka, the idol has been worshipped for more than 2500 years, there is a 3000 years old tree fossil inside the temple premises.
  636 - 38 CE - Chinese visitor Huen Tsang writes about a shrine on a hill top flashing light, at about a distance of 200 lee south west to Patna-The location is only of Mundeshwari.
  1790 CE - Daniel brothers, Thomas and William visited Mundeshwari temple and provided its first portrait.
  1888 CE – Buchanan visited the region in 1813.
  1891-92 CE – First part of the broken Mundeshwari Inscription was discovered by Bloch during a survey by East India Company.
  1903 CE – Second part of the inscription was discovered while clearing the debris around the temple.
  2003 CE – Brahmi script royal seal of Sri Lankan king Dutthagamani (101-77 BCE) was discovered by Varanasi-based historian Jahnawi Shakhar Roy which changed the earlier findings about history of the place.
  2008 CE - The date of the inscription was established 30th year of Saka era (108 CE) by the scholars in a national seminar organized for the purpose by Bihar State Religious Trust Board at Patna.

Deity 
The worship of Devi Durga in the form of Devi Mundeshwari in the temple is also indicative of tantric cult of worship, which is practiced in Eastern India.

Religious significance
Rituals and worship have been performed here without a break, hence Mundeshwari is considered one of the most ancient Hindu temples in India. The temple is visited by a large number of pilgrims each year, particularly during the Ramnavami, Shivratri festivals. A big annual fair (mela) is held nearby during the Navaratra visited by thousands.

Architecture
The temple, built of stone, is on an octagonal plan, which is rare. It is the earliest specimen of the Nagara style of temple architecture in Bihar. There are doors or windows on four sides and small niches for the reception of statues in the remaining four walls. The temple shikhara or tower has been destroyed. However, a roof has been built, as part of renovation work. The interior walls have niches and bold mouldings which are carved with vase and foliage designs. At the entrance to the temple, the door jambs are seen with carved images of Dvarapalas, Ganga, Yamuna and many other murtis. The main deities in the sanctum sanctorum of the temple are of the Devi Mundeshwari and  Chaturmukh (four-faced) Shiva linga. There are also two stone vessels of unusual design. Even though the Shiva linga is installed in the centre of the sanctum, the main presiding deity is Devi Mundeshwari deified inside a niche, which is seen with ten hands holding symbols riding a buffalo, attributed to Mahishasuramardini. The temple also has murtis of other popular gods such as Ganesha, Surya and Vishnu. A substantial part of this stone structure has been damaged, and many stone fragments are seen strewn around the temple. However, under the jurisdiction of ASI, it has been the subject of archaeological study for quite some time.

Renovation and restoration 
The Archaeological Survey of India has restored the temple under instruction from the Union Ministry of Culture. Restorative works included the removal of soot from the temple interior via a chemical treatment, repair of damage to religious murti (idol) and cataloging and documentation of scattered fragments for later reuse. Other works included installation of solar powered lighting, displays for antiquities and provision of public amenities. The Government of Bihar has allocated Rs 2 crore to improve access to the temple.

How to reach 
It can be reached by road via Patna, Gaya, or Varanasi. 
The nearest railway station is at Mohania - Bhabua Road railway station from where the temple is 22 km by road.

Lal Bahadur Shastri International Airport, Varanasi  is the nearest airport, located at a distance of 102 km from the Temple. Indian carriers including Air India, Spicejet, and international carriers like Air India, Thai Airways International, Korean Air and Naaz Airlines operate from here. Daily flights to Delhi, Mumbai and Kolkata are available from here.

References

External links

Album

Hindu pilgrimage sites in India
Hindu temples in Bihar
2nd-century Hindu temples
Shiva temples in Bihar
Durga temples